This is a list of museums in Cincinnati and non-profit and university art galleries. 

See also List of museums in Ohio for other museums in Hamilton County, Ohio and the rest of the state.
See also List of museums in Cleveland and List of museums in Columbus, Ohio.

Museums

Defunct museums 
 Hauck House Museum, Cincinnati, no longer open as a museum

See also 
 List of museums in the United States

References

External links 
 Ohio Museums Association

Museums
Cincinnati
museums